Eupithecia tarensis is a moth in the family Geometridae first described by Leo Schwingenschuss in 1939. It is found in Iran.

References

External links

Moths described in 1939
tarensis
Moths of the Middle East